Patmos is an unincorporated community located in Sharkey County, Mississippi, United States, along Mississippi Highway 16.

References

Unincorporated communities in Sharkey County, Mississippi
Unincorporated communities in Mississippi